Daffy Doodles is a 1946 Warner Bros. Looney Tunes cartoon directed by Bob McKimson. The cartoon was released on April 6, 1946, and stars Daffy Duck and Porky Pig.

Daffy is the notorious "moustache fiend", bent on putting a mustache on every lip in sight, while Porky is a police officer intent on capturing Daffy.

This cartoon is the first full-length cartoon that animator Robert McKimson directed. (He previously directed the wartime short The Return of Mr. Hook.) Mel Blanc provided the voices for the characters, and Warren Foster was the writer.

Plot 
A narrator intones that in a large eastern city, the residents are terrified and the police baffled—all because someone has been painting moustaches on all the advertisements in sight; even people are victims to having mustaches painted on them. As the narrator states the suspect could be anyone ("It could be you! It could be me!"), Daffy Duck eventually confesses to being the guilty party to the audience, and explains his motive in poetry:
"We've all got a mission in life,
We get into different ruts.
Some are the cogs on the wheels,
Others are just plain nuts.
I'm just wild about Harry,
And Harry's wild about me!

Science is some folks' calling,
Others pilot a ship.
My mission in life stated simply is
A mustache on every lip."

Porky Pig, as a police officer, is set as a "booby trap"— he is holding up a picture frame around his own face. Daffy sees through the trap and sets one of his own— he disguises himself as a Christmas present and manages to draw a mustache on Porky's face and run off. As Porky gives chase, Daffy runs off to a subway platform, where he cleverly paints mustaches on the commuters. He then tricks Porky into getting on the arriving train and escapes (not before giving Porky another mustache).

Later on Porky, having come across more of Daffy's work, sees Daffy, a rope around his waist, painting a mustache on a giant billboard face. Porky gives chase and gets up to the billboard as Daffy is singing "She Was an Acrobat's Daughter" while still swinging from the rope. Porky clubs Daffy in the head, and Daffy wanders to the edge. He jumps and seemingly falls to his death, but in fact stops on the ledge around the roof and paints a mustache on Porky. Porky, whispering to the audience "I hate that d-d-d-d-duck!", chases Daffy around the ledge.

The chase continues with Daffy on a motor bike and ends back on the roof, where both of them crash through a skylight, leaving Porky with a literal handlebar moustache amid the wreckage. Porky chases Daffy through the building, where the duck cleverly gives him more mustaches. Porky finally spots Daffy inside a mail chute and races downstairs to pull him out. Daffy arrives and slaps handcuffs on himself and Porky upon accusing the latter of "robbing a mailbox." While still handcuffed, Daffy places one more mustache on Porky and laughs, but this time, the tables are turned and he is clubbed by Porky.

Daffy ends up in court and pleads to the bulldog judge for mercy and to not send him to "Sing-Sing-Sing... Sing". When the jury (all composed of moustached Jerry Colonnas) finds Daffy not guilty, Daffy swears never again to draw another mustache; instead, he declares he will paint beards. He then laughs as he paints a beard on the judge and paints over the screen until it is all black.

Home media
The cartoon is available on at least two VHS tapes: "Porky!" and also "Porky Pig & Daffy Duck Cartoon Festival featuring Tick Tock Tuckered". It also included as a bonus feature of the DVD My Reputation, starring Barbara Stanwyck.

See also 
 List of Daffy Duck cartoons

References

External links 

 

1946 films
1946 animated films
1946 short films
Films directed by Robert McKimson
Looney Tunes shorts
1940s Warner Bros. animated short films
Daffy Duck films
Porky Pig films
1940s police comedy films